Neurey-en-Vaux is a commune in the Haute-Saône department in the region of Bourgogne-Franche-Comté in eastern France. It has 152 inhabitants (1999)

See also
Communes of the Haute-Saône department

References

Communes of Haute-Saône